The 2007 ECM Prague Open was a professional tennis tournament played on outdoor clay courts. It was part of the 2007 ATP Challenger Series and of the 2007 WTA Tour as a Tier IV tournament. It took place in Prague, Czech Republic between 7 and 13 May 2007.

The tournament included tennis exhibition involving Goran Ivanisevic and Richard Krajicek.

Points and prize money

Point distribution

Prize money

Players

Men's singles

Seeds
All rankings correspond to the ATP Challenger Tour

Other entrants
The following players received wildcards into the singles main draw:
  Martin Durdík
  Dušan Karol
  Dušan Lojda
  Félix Mantilla Botella

The following players received entry via a special exempt into the singles main draw:
  Bohdan Ulihrach

The following players received entry from the qualifying draw:
  Mathieu Montcourt
  Andis Juška
  Peter Wessels
  Timo Nieminen

Withdrawals
  Bohdan Ulihrach (Left leg)
  Jan Hájek (Left knee)

Men's doubles

Seeds
All rankings correspond to the ATP Challenger Tour

Other entrants
The following pairs received wildcards into the doubles main draw:
  Ivo Minář /  Jiří Vaněk
  Ladislav Chramosta /  Filip Zeman

Women's singles

Seeds

Other entrants
The following players received wildcards into the singles main draw:
  Iveta Benešová
  Karolína Plíšková
  Kristýna Plíšková

The following players received an entry into the singles main draw as lucky losers:
  Renata Voráčová

The following players received entry from the qualifying draw:
  Barbora Záhlavová-Strýcová
  Klára Zakopalová
  Andrea Hlaváčková
  Dominika Cibulková

Withdrawals
  Renata Voráčová
  Victoria Azarenka (Right hip strain)

Women's doubles

Seeds

Other entrants
The following pairs received wildcards into the doubles main draw:
  Kristýna Plíšková /  Karolína Plíšková

Withdrawals

  Arantxa Parra Santonja (Abdominal strain)

Finals

Men's singles

 Dušan Lojda defeated   Jiří Vaněk, 6–7(3–7), 6–2, 7–6(7–5)

Men's doubles

 Tomáš Cibulec /  Jordan Kerr defeated  Leoš Friedl /  David Škoch, 6–4, 6–2

Women's singles

 Akiko Morigami defeated   Marion Bartoli, 6–1, 6–3

Women's doubles

 Petra Cetkovská /  Andrea Hlaváčková defeated  Ji Chunmei /  Sun Shengnan, 7–6(9–7), 6–2

References

External links

Men's Singles draw
Men's Doubles draw
Women's Singles Qualifying and Main Draw, Women's Doubles draw
ITF Women's tournament draw

Prague Open
Prague Open
Prague Open
Prague